Elegy for a Revolutionary is a 2013 short film directed and written by Paul van Zyl. The film stars Brian Ames, Martin Copping, and Michael Enright, and is based on the true story of a group of young white South Africans trying to protest apartheid.

Copping's role as Jeremy James won the Best Actor award at the 2013 Filmstock Film Festival.

Cast
Brian Ames as Donald Quick
Martin Copping as Jeremy James
Michael Enright as Sersant
Steve Humphreys as Hendricks
Glen Vaughan as Hunter
David Ross Paterson as Judge
Marcia Battise as Miriam
Tomas Boykin as Ori
Anthony Holiday as Maduba
Keston John as Henry

Reception
Film Threat gave a positive review for the film, saying that their "only complaint about Elegy for a Revolutionary is that it’s a short and not a feature".

References

External links

2013 films
South African short documentary films
2013 short documentary films
Documentary films about apartheid